Taekwondo competitions at the 2019 Southeast Asian Games were held from 7 to 9 December 2019 at the Ninoy Aquino Stadium in Malate, Manila, Philippines.

Participating nations
A total of 24 athletes from 9 nations participated (the numbers of athletes are shown in parentheses).

Medal table

Medalists

Poomsae

Men's kyorugi

Women's kyorugi

References

External links
 

2019
Southeast Asian Games
2019 Southeast Asian Games events